A crevasse is a deep crack, that forms in a glacier or ice sheet  that can be a few inches across to over 40 feet. Crevasses form as a result of the movement and resulting stress associated with the shear stress generated when two semi-rigid pieces above a plastic substrate have different rates of movement. The resulting intensity of the shear stress causes a breakage along the faces.

Description
Crevasses often have vertical or near-vertical walls, which can then melt and create seracs, arches, and other ice formations. These walls sometimes expose layers that represent the glacier's stratigraphy. Crevasse size often depends upon the amount of liquid water present in the glacier. A crevasse may be as deep as 45 metres and as wide as 20 metres.

A crevasse may be covered, but not necessarily filled, by a snow bridge made of the previous years' accumulation and snow drifts. The result is that crevasses are rendered invisible, and thus potentially lethal to anyone attempting to navigate their way across a glacier.  Occasionally a snow bridge over an old crevasse may begin to sag, providing some landscape relief, but this cannot be relied upon. Groups planning to travel on a glacier with hidden crevasses must be trained to move as a rope team and have proper equipment.

The presence of water in a crevasse can significantly increase its penetration. Water-filled crevasses may reach the bottom of glaciers or ice sheets and provide a direct hydrologic connection between the surface, where significant summer melting occurs, and the bed of the glacier, where additional water may moisten and lubricate the bed and accelerate ice flow.

Types of crevasses

Longitudinal crevasses form parallel to flow where the glacier width is expanding. They develop in areas of tensile stress, such as where a valley widens or bends. They are typically concave down and form an angle greater than 45° with the margin.
Splaying crevasses appear along the edges of a glacier and result from shear stress from the margin of the glacier and longitudinal compressing stress from lateral extension. They extend from the glacier's margin and are concave up with respect to glacier flow, making an angle less than 45° with the margin. 
Transverse crevasses are the most common crevasse type. They form in a zone of longitudinal extension where the principal stresses are parallel to the direction of glacier flow, creating extensional tensile stress. These crevasses stretch across the glacier transverse to the flow direction, or cross-glacier.  They generally form where a valley becomes steeper.

See also

References

Bibliography

External links

Glaciology
Glacial landforms
Mountaineering
 
Hazards of outdoor recreation